Reginald Legrande Royals (September 18, 1950 – April 16, 2009) was an American basketball player who played professionally in the original American Basketball Association (ABA).

Royals, a 6'10" center from Whiteville, North Carolina, played college basketball at Florida State University from 1970 to 1973.  In his career, Royals averaged 16.7 points and 12.0 rebounds per game and as a junior led the Seminoles to the program's first Final Four in 1972.

Following the close of his college career, Royals was drafted by both the Philadelphia 76ers of the National Basketball Association (NBA) and the New York Nets of the American Basketball Association (ABA).  However, his professional career lasted just two ABA games (and 4 total points) for the San Diego Conquistadors in the 1974–75 season.

Royals died on April 16, 2009 at the Lower Cape Fear Hospice in Wilmington, North Carolina.

References

External links
College stats at Nolefan.org

1950 births
2009 deaths
American men's basketball players
Basketball players from North Carolina
Centers (basketball)
Florida State Seminoles men's basketball players
New York Nets draft picks
People from Whiteville, North Carolina
Philadelphia 76ers draft picks
San Diego Conquistadors players